The Essential Diana Ross: Some Memories Never Fade was a concert residency by American singer Diana Ross at The Venetian Las Vegas. The residency features all of the singer's hits with The Supremes and music from her solo career as well.

Set list
The following set list was obtained from the concert held on April 1, 2015. It does not represent all shows during the residency.
"I'm Coming Out" 
"More Today Than Yesterday"
"My World Is Empty Without You" / "Where Did Our Love Go" / "Baby Love" 
"Stop! In The Name Of Love" 
"You Can't Hurry Love"
"Love Child"
"The Boss"
"Touch Me in the Morning"
"Love Hangover" / "Take Me Higher"
"Ease On Down The Road"
"The Look Of Love"
"Endless Love"
"Don't Explain"
"Theme from Mahogany (Do You Know Where You're Going To)" 
"Why Do Fools Fall In Love?"
"Ain't No Mountain High Enough"
"I Will Survive" 

Encore
Reach Out and Touch (Somebody's Hand)"

Shows

References 

concert residencies in the Las Vegas Valley
Diana Ross concert tours
2015 concert residencies
2017 concert residencies